The 2005 Oceania Handball Nations Cup was the second edition of the Oceania Handball Nations Cup, held from 24–28 May in Sydney, Australia. The winner qualified for the 2005 World Women's Handball Championship.

Australia and New Zealand played a two-game series to determine the winner.

Overview

All times are local (UTC+10).

Game 1

Game 2

References

External links
Oceania Continent Handball Federation webpage

2005 Women's Oceania Handball Championship
Oceania Handball Championship
Women's handball in Australia
2005 in Australian sport
May 2005 sports events in Australia